White Water, White Bloom is the second full-length album by the indie rock band Sea Wolf, released in 2009 on Dangerbird Records. The first single from the album was "Wicked Blood".

Track listing
All songs by Alex Brown Church.

 "Wicked Blood" – 4:25
 "Dew in the Grass" – 4:24
 "Orion & Dog" – 3:49
 "Turn the Dirt Over" – 2:59
 "O Maria!" – 4:00
 "White Water, White Bloom" – 4:29
 "Spirit Horse" – 3:53
 "The Orchard" – 3:26
 "The Traitor" – 4:17
 "Winter's Heir" – 4:20
 "Stanislaus" – 4:12**
 "Fighting Bull" – 4:21**

** Vinyl-only bonus tracks

Charts

References

2009 albums
Dangerbird Records albums
Sea Wolf (band) albums